The Central Bank of Kenya (CBK) is the monetary authority of Kenya. Its head office is located in Nairobi. CBK was founded by in 1966 after the dissolution of East African Currency Board (EACB). Dr. Patrick Ngugi Njoroge is current Governor of CBK and Sheila M’Mbijjewe is the Deputy Governor.

Organizational structure

Management
The bank’s executive management team comprises the governor, deputy governors and heads of departments. The governor assumes the role of Chief Executive Officer of the bank and is therefore responsible for its overall management. The governor is also the bank’s official spokesperson.

Governor
The current governor of the bank is Patrick Ngugi Njoroge. Former governors of the bank are:
 Prof. Njuguna Ndung'u (March 2007 – March 2015)
 Dr. Andrew Mullei (March 2003 – March 2007)
 Nahashon Nyagah (April 2001 – March 2003)
 Micah Cheserem (July 1993 – April 2001)
Eric Cheruiyot Kotut (January 1988 – July 1993)
 Philip Ndegwa (December 1982 – January 1988)
 Duncan Ndegwa (May 1967 – December 1982)
 Dr. Leon Baranski (May 1966 – May 1967)

Deputy governor
The current deputy governor is Sheila M'Mbijjewe. Former deputy governors include:
 Dr. Haron Sirima (2011–2015)
 Dr. Hezron Nyangito (2008–2011)
 Jacinta Wanjala Mwatela (2004–2008), acting Governor 2006–2007
 Edward C. Sambili (2001–2004)
 Thomas Nzioki Kibua (1993–2001)
 Wanjohi Muriithi (1991–1993)
 Eliphaz Riungu (1988–1991)
Eric Cheruiyot Kotut (1984–1988)
 Ahmed Abdallah (1967–1984)

Members of the board
The current board of directors is as follows:
 Mohammed Nyaoga – Chairman of the Board
 Principal Secretary to the National Treasury
 Dr. Patrick Njoroge – Governor
 Nelius Kariuki – member 
 Rachel Dzombo – member
 Ravi Ruparel – member
 Samson Cherutich – member
 Charity Kisotu – member

Departments
 Governor's Office
 Banking Services
 National Payments System and Risk Management
 Research 
 Bank Supervision
 Financial Markets
 Currency Operations and Branch Administration
 Strategic Management
 Finance and IMS 
 Procurement and Logistics Services 
 Internal Audit
 Human Resources
 Kenya School of Monetary Studies

History and powers 
Amid the COVID-19 pandemic, the CBK instituted a loan restructuring program to help financially distressed borrowers. The restructuring program was in place from March 2020 to March 2021. 

In 2021, legislation passed the National Assembly that allows the CBK to cap interest rates and to revoke the licenses of digital lenders that breach the Data Protection Act or the Consumer Protection Act.

See also

List of central banks of Africa
Economy of Kenya
List of central banks
Kenyan shilling

References 

 

Banks of Kenya
Economy of Kenya
Kenya
Bank
Nairobi
Banks established in 1966
Kenyan companies established in 1966